The term "Inter-Party Government" may refer to:
the First Inter-Party Government, government of Ireland from 1948 to 1951
the Second Inter-Party Government, government of Ireland from 1954 to 1957
any coalition government